ZAL | Riu Vell is a Barcelona Metro station located in the Zona Franca neighbourhood of the Barcelona municipality, served by line L10. Since its opening, the station is the southern terminus of Line 10 Sud.

The station name refers to the ZAL or Zona d'Activitats Logístiques (Zone of Logistical Activities), while Riu Vell (Old River) refers to the old bed of the Llobregat river which was diverted in 2004 in order to reduce the risk of flooding.

References

Barcelona Metro line 10 stations
Railway stations in Spain opened in 2021